Information about local government areas and locality boundaries has been sourced from the 2006 Perth StreetSmart Street Directory published by West Australian Newspapers Ltd on behalf of the Department of Land Information, Western Australia.

Suburbs 

 Bouvard
 Clifton
 Coodanup
 Dawesville
 Dudley Park
 Erskine
 Falcon
 Greenfields
 Halls Head
 Herron
 Lakelands
 Madora Bay
 Mandurah
 Meadow Springs
 Parklands
 San Remo
 Silver Sands
 Wannanup

Nearby localities 

 Golden Bay
 Herron
 Karnup
 Lake Clifton
 Nambeelup
 North Yunderup
 Ravenswood
 Singleton
 South Yunderup

Former suburbs 
 East Mandurah
 Florida
 Goegrup
 Mandurah Beach
 Melros
 Park Ridge
 Riverside Gardens

Mandurah
 
Mandurah suburbs